Celestiial / Blood of the Black Owl Split is a split album released by Bindrune Recordings featuring one song each from funeral doom metal bands Celestiial and Blood of the Black Owl. It was limited to 500 12" vinyls, with each song exclusive to the album, and the first 50 albums shipped were delivered with two cloth patches.

Track listing
"White Depths Dove the Red-Eyed" (16:54) (Celestiial)
"Contemplating the Death of an Old Friend" (17:05) (Blood of the Black Owl)

References

Celestiial albums
Blood of the Black Owl albums
Split EPs
2008 EPs